Liam O'Brien (born 11 October 1954) is an Irish middle-distance runner. He competed in the men's 3000 metres steeplechase at the 1984 Summer Olympics.

References

1954 births
Living people
Athletes (track and field) at the 1984 Summer Olympics
Irish male middle-distance runners
Irish male steeplechase runners
Olympic athletes of Ireland
Place of birth missing (living people)